Lana Skeledžija (born 5 April 1982) is a Croatian female sport shooter. She competed at the 2013 Summer Deaflympics and in the 2017 Summer Deaflympics representing Croatia.

She claimed her first Deaflympic medal which was a silver medal in the women's air pistol event at the 2013 Summer Deaflympics. In the 2017 Summer Deaflympics, she equalled the Deaflympic record in the women's 10m air pistol qualification event held by Russia's Katorgina Evdokia.

References 

1982 births
Living people
Croatian female sport shooters
Deaf sportspeople
Deaflympic competitors
Croatian deaf people
21st-century Croatian women